Pope John Paul II's political views were considered conservative on issues relating to reproduction and the ordination of women during his 26-year reign as pope of the Roman Catholic Church and sovereign of Vatican City. A series of 129 lectures given by John Paul during his Wednesday audiences in Rome between September 1979 and November 1984 were later compiled and published as a single work entitled ‘Theology of the Body’, an extended meditation on the nature of human sexuality. He also extended it to condemnation of abortion, euthanasia and virtually all uses of capital punishment, calling them all a part of the "culture of death" that is pervasive in the modern world, advocating instead what he understood to be a "culture of life".  He campaigned for world debt forgiveness and social justice.

Relations with dictatorships 

In 1984 through "Instruction on Certain Aspects of the 'Theology of Liberation,'" and similar documents employing the voice of Cardinal Ratzinger, leader of the Congregation for the Doctrine of the Faith, John Paul II officially articulated his reservations about some forms of Liberation theology supplanting traditional Catholic doctrine. Liberation theology had many followers in South America. Óscar Romero's attempt, during his visit to Europe, to obtain a Vatican condemnation of El Salvador's regime, denounced for violations of human rights and its support of death squads, was a failure. In his travel to Managua, Nicaragua in 1983, John Paul II harshly condemned what he dubbed the "popular Church" (i.e. "ecclesial base communities" (CEBs) supported by the CELAM), and the Nicaraguan clergy's tendencies to support the leftist Sandinistas, reminding the clergy of their duties of obedience to the Holy See.

John Paul II was criticised for visiting Augusto Pinochet in Chile. He invited him to restore democracy, but, critics claim, not in as firm terms as the ones he used against communist regimes. John Paul also allegedly endorsed Pío Cardinal Laghi, who critics say supported the "Dirty War" in Argentina and was on friendly terms with the Argentine generals of the military dictatorship, allegedly playing regular tennis matches with general Jorge Rafael Videla.  However, the Pope has been linked to the fall of Jean-Claude Duvalier's dictatorship in Haiti.  He was also critical of the Chinese Communist regime and the Chinese Patriotic Catholic Association running the church and appointing bishops without the consent of the Holy See, and maintained strong ties with underground Catholic groups.

The pope, who began his papacy when the Soviet regime controlled his native country of Poland, as well as the rest of Central and Eastern Europe, was a critic of Communism, and supported the Polish Solidarity movement. Former Soviet President Mikhail Gorbachev once said the collapse of the Iron Curtain would have been impossible without John Paul II.

In later years, after having condemned Liberation theology, John Paul II criticised some of the more extreme versions of capitalism. "Unfortunately, not everything the West proposes as a theoretical vision or as a concrete lifestyle reflects Gospel values." He saw in capitalism certain "viruses": indifferentism, hedonism, secularism, consumerism, practical materialism, and also formal atheism.

Jubilee 2000 campaign 

In 2000 he publicly endorsed the Jubilee 2000 campaign on African debt relief fronted by Irish rock stars Bob Geldof and Bono. It was reported that during this period, U2's recording sessions were repeatedly interrupted by phone calls from the Pope, wanting to discuss the campaign with Bono.

Iraq war 

In 2003 John Paul II also became a prominent critic of the 2003 US-led invasion of Iraq. In his 2003 State of the World address the Pope declared his opposition to the invasion by stating, "No to war! War is not always inevitable. It is always a defeat for humanity." He sent former Apostolic Pro-Nuncio to the United States Pío Cardinal Laghi to talk with American President George W. Bush to express opposition to the war. John Paul II said that it was up to the United Nations to solve the international conflict through diplomacy and that a unilateral aggression is a crime against peace and a violation of international law.

European Constitutional Treaty 

In European Union negotiations for a new European Constitutional Treaty in 2003 and 2004, the Vatican's representatives failed to secure any mention of Europe's "Christian heritage"—one of the Pope's cherished goals.

Sexuality 

While taking a traditional position on sexuality, defending the Church's moral opposition to marriage for same-sex couples, the pope asserted that persons with homosexual inclinations possess the same inherent dignity and rights as everybody else. In his last book, Memory and Identity, he referred to the "pressures" on the European Parliament to permit "homosexual 'marriage'". In the book, as quoted by Reuters, he wrote: “It is legitimate and necessary to ask oneself if this is not perhaps part of a new ideology of evil, perhaps more insidious and hidden, which attempts to pit human rights against the family and against man.”

The Pope also reaffirmed the Church's existing teaching on gender in relation to transsexuals, as the Congregation for the Doctrine of the Faith, which he supervised, made clear that transsexuals can not serve in church positions.

Scientific theories and the interpretation of Genesis 

In an address on 22 October 1996, to the Pontifical Academy of Sciences, Pope John Paul II reaffirmed the Church's openness to the theory of evolution:

In the same address, the Pope rejected any theory of evolution that provides a materialistic explanation for the human soul:

John Paul II also wrote to the Pontifical Academy of Sciences on the subject of cosmology and how to interpret Genesis:

References
Notes